Lynnwood/Millican is a planned and approved CTrain light rail station in Calgary, Alberta, Canada part of the Green Line. Construction will begin in 2022 and complete in 2027 as part of construction stage one, segment one. The station is located in the districts of Lynnwood and Millican Estates in the community of Ogden, at the junction of Ogden Road SE and Millican Road SE, adjacent to the Pop Davies Athletic Park.   

The station is one of only three stations in stage-one to feature a park and ride and is the first CTrain station ever to be constructed southeast of Deerfoot Trail. The parking lot will be on the site of the former Imperial Oil Refinery. The station will connect low density residential to the west of the station, and an industrial area to the east. The CP Rail Headquarters are within walking distance of the station.

References 

CTrain stations
Railway stations scheduled to open in 2027